The FIBT World Championships 1995 took place in Winterberg, Germany (Bobsleigh) and on 1–5 March in Lillehammer, Norway (Skeleton). This was the first time both cities hosted a championship event.

Two man bobsleigh

The Canadians earned their first championship medal since 1965 while the French earned their first medal since 1947.

Four man bobsleigh

Men's skeleton

Medal table

References

2-Man bobsleigh World Champions
4-Man bobsleigh World Champions
Men's skeleton World Champions

IBSF World Championships
World Championships
FIBT World Championships
FIBT World Championships
1995 in skeleton 
International sports competitions hosted by Germany
Bobsleigh in Germany 
International sports competitions hosted by Norway
Bobsleigh in Norway
Skeleton in Norway
Sport in Lillehammer

de:Skeleton-Weltmeisterschaft 1995